Uwiedziona is a 1931 Polish film directed by Michał Waszyński.

Cast
Maria Malicka ...  Lena 
Kazimierz Junosza-Stępowski ...  Rawicz 
Krystyna Ankwicz ...  Maria Rawicza 
Zbigniew Sawan ...  Jerzy Rawicz 
Tadeusz Olsza ...  Gustav von Wollendorf 
Irena Dalma ...  Young Girl 
Eliza Fischer ...  Young Girl 
Marta Flantz ...  Madame 
Michal Halicz ...  Cousin 
Oktawian Kaczanowski   
Jan Kochanowicz ...  Defense Attorney 
Leon Rechenski ...  Presiding Judge 
Jan Rogozinski   
Stanisław Sielański ...  Guest 
Czesław Skonieczny ...  Tailor 
Zofia Slaska   
Tadeusz Wesolowski ...  Jerzy's Friend 
Janusz Ziejewski...  Jerzy's Friend 
Zbigniew Ziembinski...  Journalist

External links 
 

1931 films
1930s Polish-language films
Polish black-and-white films
Films directed by Michał Waszyński